The Hell Island Site (7NC-F-7) is a prehistoric archaeological site located near Odessa, Delaware.  The site is a type site for a class of ceramics found at other sites in the region.  Artifacts recovered from the site during excavations in 1965 yielded then-distinctive tempered pottery with cordmarking on the interior and exterior, as well as evidence of occupation of the site from the Archaic to the Late Woodland Period.

The site was listed on the National Register of Historic Places in 1977.

See also
National Register of Historic Places in southern New Castle County, Delaware

References

Archaeological sites on the National Register of Historic Places in Delaware
New Castle County, Delaware
National Register of Historic Places in New Castle County, Delaware